The Royal Flying Corps Canada (RFC Canada) was a training organization of the British Royal Flying Corps located in Canada during the First World War. It began operating in 1917.

Background

As the war progressed, Great Britain found that it needed more trained aircrew and more training facilities. Training was provided both by the Curtiss Aviation School at Long Branch near Toronto (land plane training) and Hanlan's Point on Toronto Island (for flying boat training), and in the United States.

The British realized that thousands of Canadians and Americans had joined British flying operations and more wanted to join, so it made sense to open British air training stations in Canada. Canada also had space for such facilities. After much negotiation with the Canadian government, the RFC, commanded in Canada by Lieutenant-Colonel (later Brigadier-General) Cuthbert Hoare, began operating several training stations in southern Ontario. Stations were opened at Camp Borden (main training site), Beamsville, Hamilton (armament school), North Toronto (Armour Heights, Leaside and Long Branch), and Deseronto (Mohawk and Rathburn).  The JN-4 (Canadian) (Canuck) was used for training; 500 Avro 504Ks had been ordered but only one had been completed in Canada before the war ended in November 1918 and it was not used.

Hoare made several agreements with U.S. Brigadier-General George O. Squier (US Army Signal Corps) and the US Aircraft Production Board. Squier had overall responsibility for the US Army’s air service, which was short of flight instructors. The RFC released five experienced American pilots to the US Army, where they became squadron commanders. The US Air Board acquiesced in the British opening a recruiting office in New York City, ostensibly to recruit British citizens, but it also solicited US citizens, of whom about 300 were successfully signed up. The RFC would also train many US Army flight personnel: 400 pilots; 2,000 ground-crew members; and 20 equipment officers. These Americans would then collect aircraft and equipment from the UK, before coming under RFC control in France. Ten American squadrons would train in Canada during the summer of 1917, while RFC squadrons were allowed to train during the winter in Fort Worth, Texas.

When the Royal Flying Corps became the Royal Air Force in April 1918, the unit became known as Royal Air Force Canada. 

During the last two years of the war 3,135 pilots and 137 observers trained in Canada and Texas for both the RFC and the new Royal Air Force (RAF). Of these trainees, 2,624 went to Europe for operational duty.

Notes

References

External links
 
 

Military units and formations established in 1917